Velen is a town in North Rhine-Westphalia, Germany. Velen may also refer to:

Veleň, municipality and village in the Central Bohemian Region of the Czech Republic
Malá Veleň, municipality and village in the Ústí nad Labem Region of the Czech Republic
Oldřich Velen (1921–2013), Czech actor
Velen Fanderlik (1907–1985), Chairman of the Czechoslovakian Scouting organization Junák
Velen., taxonomic author abbreviation of Josef Velenovský (1858–1949), Czech botanist